Neocoenyra fuligo is a butterfly in the family Nymphalidae. It is found in central Tanzania. The habitat consists of montane grassland at altitudes between 2,000 and 2,100 meters.

References

Satyrini
Butterflies described in 1990
Endemic fauna of Tanzania
Butterflies of Africa